Crudosilis ruficollis is a species of soldier beetles native to Europe.

Synonyms:
 Silis ruficollis (Fabricius, 1775)

References

Cantharidae
Beetles described in 1775
Taxa named by Johan Christian Fabricius
Beetles of Europe